Arthur Atzianov (born March 3, 1991) is an Israeli footballer.

Career
Atzianov grew up in the youth department of Hapoel Tel Aviv and was promoted to the senior team during 2010–11, getting his first appearances for the team in the Toto Cup and the State Cup, which Hapoel Tel Aviv eventually won.

During 2012–13, Atzianov was loaned to Hapoel Ramat Gan and helped the club win the State Cup before returning to Hapoel Tel Aviv. However, at the beginning of the training camp for the following season, Atzianov was diagnosed with a heart problem and had to retire from active football.

Honours
Israel State Cup (3):
2010–11, 2011–12 (with Hapoel Tel Aviv), 2012–13 (with Hapoel Ramat Gan)

References

External links
 

1991 births
Living people
Israeli footballers
Hapoel Tel Aviv F.C. players
Hapoel Ramat Gan F.C. players
Israeli Premier League players
Association football wingers
Association football fullbacks